Harihara ( also called Harihar) is a city in Davanagere District in the Indian state of Karnataka. It is the administrative headquarters of the Harihara Taluk. Harihara is famous for Harihareshwara temple, also known as "Dakshina Kashi", and as the "Industrial Hub of central Karnataka."

Harihara is situated on the banks of the Tungabhadra River, 275 kilometres north of Bangalore. Harihar and Davangere (14 km away) are referred as "twin cities". Harihar is connected by road and railway, and is located on national Highway 4 (Puna – Bangalore). It has a very pleasant climate year round.  The major lifeline of this city is the Tungabhadra river, which is being exploited and polluted as a result of heavy industrialization.

History

Harihara (or Hari-hara) is a syncretic deity in Hinduism, combining the two major gods Vishnu(Hari) and Shiva (Hara). Images of Harihara (also known as Sambhu-Visnu and Sankara-Narayana, variants of the names of the two gods) began to appear in the classical period after sectarian movements, which elevated one god as supreme over the others, had waned sufficiently for efforts at compromise to be attempted. The region of Harihara had been under the control of the Hoysalas from the 11th to 13th centuries AD.

There is a famous temple built in the 12th century during Hoysala's time called Harihareshwara temple (Guharanya Kshetra).

Legend 
The god Harihareshwara is a combination of the gods Shiva and Vishnu. There is a story behind the avatar of this god. In ancient days this place was known as "Guharanya", a dense jungle and habitat of a demon Guhasura. He had a gift that no human or Rakshasa or god can kill him. And he started harassing people around this place. Then Vishnu and Shiva came together in a new avatara called Hari – Hara (Harihara) – and killed demon Guhasura.

Industry
Harihar serves as a major industrial base also. It was served by the Kirloskar industry and at present Aditya Birla Group's Grasim Industries, Synthite, Shamanur Sugar's, Cargill and more. Kirloskar Engineering company has closed down in 2001, resulting in a loss of nearly 15,000 jobs.

Attractions

Harihar is popular for temples.
 Harihareshwara Temple
 Kondajji situated a few kilometers from Harihar is a picnic spot.
 Ranibennur Blackbuck Sanctuary around 20 km
 Omkar Math
 Banashankari Temple on the Banks of Tungabhadra.
 Kanyaka Parameshwari Temple in Temple Street.
 Raghavendra Swamy temple (popularly known as Raayara Matha)
 Ayyappa Temple other side of the river.
 Rajanahalli Hanumappa temple (Hanuman temple in Rajanahalli, around 6 km from Harihar on bypass highway)
 Maargadha Durgamma temple (towards Ranibennur on NH4, around 3 km)
 Kumaranahalli Sri Ranganatha temple and Sri Ranganatha Ashram
 Mother Mary's Church
 Hazarat Chaman Shah Wali Dargha at Bathi Sharief, 6 km towards Davangere
 Hazarat Naadband Shah wali baba Dargha
 Hazarat Ahmed Shah Wali Mahmood Shah Wali Dargha.
 Narayana Aashrama 6 km towards Harapanahalli road. It is believed that original Rama Pariwara idols of Ayodhya were secretly established here.
 Satya Ganapati Temple 3 km towards Harapanahalli road.
 Kirloskar Institute of Advanced Management Studies, Yantranagar

Geography
It has an average elevation of 540 metres (1771 feet).

Demographics

 India census, Harihar had a population of 85,000. Males constitute 51% of the population and females 49%. In Harihar, 11% of the population is under 6 years of age. Kannada is the official and most spoken language.

Connectivity
Situated exactly in the middle of Karnataka, Harihar has a good connectivity with the South and North of Karnataka.

Air

The nearest airport is at Hubli 131 km from Harihar. From there one can reach Bangalore and Mumbai. The nearest International airports are 272 km and 275 km away in Mangalore and Bangalore respectively, from where one can take flights to most of the important cities in India. Harihar also has a private airport owned by Aditya Birla Group on their grounds and often used by politicians and famous personalities.

Railway

Harihara is well connected with most of the major cities like New Delhi, Mumbai, Bangalore and Chennai through regular trains. Harihar has two Railway Stations, in central Harihar and at Amaravati Colony Junction. These stations connect Harihara to Bangalore & Pune and to Hospet and Bellary via Kottur.

Road

With NH4 (Part of Golden Quadrilateral): passing close by there is a good network of roads that connects Harihar to other important cities of the region.

It is a 3-hour drive from Hubli (131 km) and 6-hour-drive from Mangalore (272 km) and Bangalore (278 km). Almost all the buses which run from/to North Karnataka to/from South Karnataka go via Harihar. The town is 14 km from Davanagere city, which was earlier a part of the Chitradurga district (78 km).

References

https://www.kiams.ac.in/

External links
 Defiling of Tungabhadra continues in Harihar

Cities and towns in Davanagere district
https://www.kiams.ac.in/